Gorakhpur–Pune Express is  an Express train belonging to North Eastern Railway zone of Indian Railways that run between  and  in India.

This train was inaugurated on 26 March 2015, flagged off by Manoj Sinha (Former Minister of State Railways) for direct connectivity between Gorakhpur and Pune.

Till 23 May 2019, it was running with ICF coach after that its also converted into LHB coach for more comfortable travel.

Service
Frequency of this train is weekly and it covers the distance of 1750 km with an average speed of 52 km/h on both sides.

Routes

Traction
As the route is electrified a WAP-4 loco pulls the train to its destination on both sides.

External links
 15029 Gorakhpur–Pune Express India Rail Info
 15030 Pune–Gorakhpur Express India Rail Info

References

Express trains in India
Passenger trains originating from Gorakhpur
Rail transport in Madhya Pradesh
Rail transport in Maharashtra
Transport in Pune